Wadstrom is an unincorporated community of Ventura County, California, United States. Wadstrom was served by the 20th century Ventura and Ojai Valley Railroad.

References

Unincorporated communities in Ventura County, California
Unincorporated communities in California